The Registan Desert, also known as Sistan Desert, is an extremely arid plateau region located between Helmand and Kandahar provinces in southeastern Afghanistan. The underlying base of the hills consists of partly stabilized ancient transverse dunes, reflecting a west-to-east wind and nearly unlimited sand supply. The desert is very sparsely populated by Baluchi and Pashtun nomads. The desert is gradually encroaching on surrounding agricultural areas.

A severe drought in 1998 caused the displacement of approximately 100,000 nomadic people from the Registan desert region. Most of them are now living in temporary settlements between the Arghandab and Helmand Rivers and Registan. A large number are also being supported by the UN in camps for internally displaced persons (IDPs) in Kandahar Province. The UN is currently seeking strategies to return the nomads to their traditional livelihood of raising livestock in Registan. The Registan Desert is migrating westward, encroaching on former agricultural areas. The United Nations Environment Programme team reports that "up to 100 villages have been submerged by windblown dust and sand". In the country's northwest, sand dunes are moving onto agricultural land, their path cleared by the loss of stabilizing vegetation from firewood gathering and overgrazing.

See also
Balochistan, Afghanistan
Geography of Afghanistan
Camp Rhino

References

External links
NASA Image - August 20, 2000
Registan Desert Bird Life Factsheet

Deserts of Afghanistan